Kanjoor is a small town near to Aluva and Perumbavoor. It is in Ernakulam district in the state of Kerala, India. The estimated population is 19,712. St Sebastian's Church is located here.

References

External links
lsgkerala.in

Cities and towns in Ernakulam district